Freudenstadt Hauptbahnhof is the main station in the town of Freudenstadt in the German state of Baden-Württemberg, and an important railway junction in the Northern Black Forest.

Location 
Freudenstadt Hauptbahnhof is located on the southeastern edge of the city, where Bahnhofstraße meets Dietersweiler Straße. Its address is Hauptbahnhof 1.

Construction of the station 
In the station building there is a Deutsche Bahn ticket office, a bakery and a kiosk.

The station has a main platform (platform 1) and an additional island platform (platform tracks 2 and 3). Platform 1 mainly serves Stadtbahn traffic towards Karlsruhe (Murg Valley Railway, Murgtalbahn) and track 2 handles all traffic on the Eutingen im Gäu–Schiltach railway line towards Eutingen im Gäu and Stuttgart. Some Stadtbahn trips (from Karlsruhe continuing to Eutingen in Gäu and vice versa) also operate from platform 2. Services on the Eutingen im Gäu–Schiltach railway line towards Hausach and Offenburg mainly use track 3.

There are various parking facilities and a bus station at the station.

Operations

Regional transport

Karlsruhe Stadtbahn

Notes

External links

Railway stations in Baden-Württemberg
Railway stations in Germany opened in 1879
Karlsruhe Stadtbahn stations
Buildings and structures in Freudenstadt (district)